The 2011–12 SK Rapid Wien season is the 114th season in club history.

Squad statistics

Goal scorers

Fixtures and results

Bundesliga

League table

Cup

References

Rapid Wien
2011-12 Rapid Wien Season